The Short-Dodson House is a historic house at 755 Park Avenue in Hot Springs, Arkansas.  It is a -story masonry structure, its exterior finished in a combination of stone, brick, and wood.  It has asymmetrical massing with projecting gables of varying sizes and shapes, and a round corner turret, with an undulating single-story porch wrapping around its south side.  It was designed by Joseph G. Horn, and built c. 1902 for Dr. Omar Short, one of many doctors whose homes lined Park Avenue.

The house was listed on the National Register of Historic Places in 1976.

See also
National Register of Historic Places listings in Garland County, Arkansas

References

Houses on the National Register of Historic Places in Arkansas
Queen Anne architecture in Arkansas
Houses in Hot Springs, Arkansas
National Register of Historic Places in Hot Springs, Arkansas